Longhorn Records was an American country music record label based in Dallas, Texas.  The label was founded in September, 1957.  Dewey Groom acquired the local Dallas label in 1960 in order to further promote acts that were appearing at the Longhorn Ballroom.  Bob Wills made his last recordings with the Texas Playboys for Longhorn in 1964 and 1965.  Wills made another session with Longhorn, post Playboys, in which the label allowed Wills to make an album of pure folk music, something Wills had long wanted to do but which had never been supported by any of his previous record labels.  One of Longhorn's biggest successes was by Phil Baugh, whose song "Country Guitar" appeared at #16 on the Country singles chart, and the accompanying album reach #4 on Billboard's Top Country Albums.  Groom closed the label in 1969 in order to devote more of his energies into the Ballroom.

Artists
 Clay Allen
 Phil Baugh
 Rozena Eads
 Al Gliva
 Billy Gray
 Janet McBride
 Vern Stovall
 Bob Wills

References

 
Record labels established in 1957
Record labels disestablished in 1969
1957 establishments in Texas
1969 disestablishments in Texas
American country music record labels